8 Marta may refer to:

8 Marta, Krasnodar Krai, rural locality in Krasnodar Krai, Russia
8 Marta, Novosibirsk Oblast, rural locality in Novosibirsk Oblast, Russia